The Fairfield Four is an American gospel group that has existed for over 100 years, starting as a trio in the Fairfield Baptist Church, Nashville, Tennessee, in 1921. They were designated as National Heritage Fellows in 1989 by the National Endowment for the Arts, which is the United States government's highest honor in the folk and traditional arts.  The group won the 1998 Grammy for Best Traditional Soul Gospel Album. As a quintet, they featured briefly in the 2000 movie O Brother, Where Art Thou?.

History
The initial iteration of the group was under the direction of the church's assistant pastor, J. R. Carrethers, and consisted of his sons Rufus and Harold plus their neighbor John Battle. In 1925, the group became a quartet when Lattimer Green joined. During the 1930s, Green left the group and William Malone and Samuel McCrary joined, but they retained the name of Fairfield Four, although it had expanded its membership beyond a quartet. Following their initial radio broadcast on WSIX, the group gained recognition outside of Nashville.

In 1942, the group won a contest that resulted in an appearance on 50,000-watt radio station WLAC, with a hook-up to the CBS network. This performance was so successful that the group continued to perform on WLAC for the next decade, and group members became celebrities within the gospel music genre.

During the 1940s, the membership of the group continued to evolve. Their first recording session was held in 1946 at Nashville's Bullet Records and over the next 15 years, the group released over 100 recordings on the Bullet, Delta, Dot, Champion, and Old Town record labels. By 1949, Sam McCrary assumed leadership of the group and they continued to record and tour with various membership changes. "The group split up in 1950, and Hill, Freeman, and Lewis moved to Greenville, Alabama, where they founded a new quartet, the Skylarks. McCrary, however, kept the Fairfield Four name and added tenors Willie Love and Willie "Little Axe" Broadnax to the group." In 1954, McCrary left the group to become a minister. More personnel changes ensued, but by the late 1950s the group's popularity had waned, along with the decline of interest in a cappella gospel singing. The group disbanded in 1960.

In 1980, the group re-formed to participate in a special "Quartet Reunion" program in Birmingham, Alabama, and they performed again in 1981 at a Smithsonian Institution program on "Black American Quartet Traditions". The revitalized group has continued to perform from the 1980s to the present.

In 1993, the group participated in the Gaither Homecoming video and music recording series. They are featured in Turn Your Radio On and Old Friends.

The group gained more popular recognition after appearing on John Fogerty's 1997 album Blue Moon Swamp, singing on the track "A Hundred and Ten in the Shade". They also undertook live appearances with Fogerty. In 2003, they performed with Dolly Parton on the song "There Will Be Peace in the Valley for Me" from her album For God and Country. They were later featured on the song "Rock of Ages" by Amy Grant & Vince Gill on Grant's 2005 studio album Rock of Ages... Hymns and Faith.

The Fairfield Four's most recent album Still Rockin' My Soul! was released on March 10, 2015, and won the Best Roots Gospel Album at the 58th Grammy awards.

Awards
 National Heritage Fellowship, 1989
 Tennessee Lifetime Achievement Award, 1994
 Nashville Music Award Lifetime Achievement Award, 1995
 James Cleveland Stellar Award, 1996
 Grammy Award for Best Traditional Gospel Album, for I Couldn't Hear Nobody Pray, 1997
 Gospel Music Hall of Fame, inducted in 1999
 Grammy Award for Album of the Year, for contribution in O Brother, Where Art Thou? soundtrack, 2002
 Grammy Award for Best Roots Gospel Album, for Still Rockin' My Soul!, 2015
 Barbershop Harmony Society Honorary Lifetime Membership, 2016

Discography

Albums
 Angels Watching Over Me  {Nashboro Records 7045} 1960 reissued on AVI, 1981 - The Dot recordings
 One World, One People, One God, One Religion, Nashboro Records, 1980
 Angels Watching Over, AVI Records, 1981
 Revival, Nixon Studio, Nashville TN, 1989
 Standing in the Safety Zone, Warner Bros., 1992
 Standing on the Rock, Nashboro Records, 1995 
 I Couldn't Hear Nobody Pray, Warner Bros., 1997
 Wreckin' the House, Dead Reckoning, 1998
 Fairfield Four and Friends Live from Mountain Stage, Blueplate, 2000
 The Bells Are Tolling, Ace, 2001
 Road to Glory, Fuel, 2001
 Beautiful Stars, Isaac Freeman and the Bluebloods, Lost Highway,  2002
 Still Rockin' My Soul, Fairfield Four Records (dist. by Thirty Tigers, Sony Red and Provident), 2015

Singles
 "Don't Let Nobody Turn You Around/Standing in the Safety Zone", Bullet 284, 1947
 "When I Get Up in Heaven/Amazing Grace", Bullet 292, 1947
 "Tree of Level/Jesus Met the Woman at the Well", Dot, 1949
 "Dear Lord, Look Down Upon Me/Savior Don't Pass Me By", Dot, 1949
 "In the Wilderness/Let Me Tell You About Jesus", Dot, 1949
 "In the Upper Room/I'll Tell the World", Dot, 1950
 "I Don't Know Why I Have to Cry/When I Move in the Room", Dot, 1950
 "Don't Drive Your Children Away/Does Jesus Care", Dot, 1950
 "Nobody to Depend On/Old Time Religion", Dot, 1950
 "No Room at the Inn/Talking About Jesus", Dot, 1950
 "I Love the Name Jesus/Leave Them There", Dot, 1950
 "On My Journey Now/Love Like a River", Dot, 1950
 "Poor Pilgrim of Sorrow/Don't Drive Her Away", Dot, 1950
 "Packing Every Burden/Don't Leave Me", Dot, 1951]
 "My Prayer/Come on to This Altar", Dot, 1951
 "Waiting for Me/Angels Watching", Dot, 1951
 "I'm in Your Care/I Can Tell You the Time", Dot, 1951
 "When We Bow/Let's Go", Dot, 1951
 "Hope to Shout in Glory/All the Way", Dot, 1951
 "I'll Be Satisfied/I've Got Good Religion", Dot, 1951
 "Come Over Here/Who Is That Knocking", Dot, 1953
 "His Eye Is on the Sparrow/Every Day", Dot, 1953
 "How I Got Over/This Evening Our Father", Dot, 1953
 "Stand by Me/Hear Me When I Pray", Dot, 1953
 "When the Battle Is Over/Standing on the Rock", Dot, 1953
 "Somebody Touched Me/Mother Don't Worry", Dot, 1953
 "We Never Grow Old/Jesus in Heaven", Dot, 1954
 "God Knows I'm a Pilgrim/Heaven in My View", Dot, 1954

Compilation appearances
 "Lonesome Valley" - O Brother, Where Art Thou? (2000)
 "Roll, Jordan, Roll" - Lifted: Songs of the Spirit (2002), Sony/Hear Music

References

Further reading
 "Fairfield Four" Contemporary Musicians. Ed. Angela M. Pilchak. Vol. 49. Thomson Gale, 2005. March 27, 2007
 Billboard, July 22, 2000, p. 6.
 Capital Times (Madison, WI), June 4, 2001, p. 3A.
 Denver Post, July 31, 1998, p. E7.
 Herald Sun (Melbourne, Australia), July 14, 2000, p. 96.
 Independent (London, England), July 12, 2000, p. 6.
 Nashville Scene, February 26, 1998.
 Sarasota Herald Tribune, April 15, 1999, p. 5E.
 Seattle Times, July 8, 2000, p. A4
  Alabama Hall of Fame, (March 19, 2004).
 Bill Friskics-Warren Adding Notes to a Folklorist’s Tunes   New York Times December 2, 2007
 Zolten, Jerry, Great God A' Mighty!:The Dixie Hummingbirds - Celebrating The Rise Of Soul Gospel Music, Oxford University Press, 2003, .

External links
 
 
 
 Performances on the Prairie Home Companion
 Zolten, Jerry, at Singers.com, Fairfield Four, short history of the group.
 Management website

American gospel musical groups
Grammy Award winners
Southern gospel performers
Musical groups from Nashville, Tennessee
Musical groups established in 1921
1921 establishments in Tennessee
National Heritage Fellowship winners
Dot Records artists
Warner Records artists
Ace Records (United States) artists
Lost Highway Records artists